Great Northern Railway Classes PG, QG, QLG and QNG were a series of 0-6-0 freight locomotives introduced from 1899 by Charles Clifford.

History
The PG class was introduced in December 1899 by Charles Clifford with  driving wheels and  cylinders. The QG's introduced in 1904 were  longer than the PG with  cylinders weighed in 2 tons heavier.

Notes

References

 
 

0-6-0 locomotives
NBL locomotives
Railway locomotives introduced in 1899
Steam locomotives of Northern Ireland
Steam locomotives of Ireland
5 ft 3 in gauge locomotives
P
Scrapped locomotives